The Arlington Gaslight Company is an historic industrial complex in Arlington, Massachusetts.  It is one of the town's few large-scale examples of industrial architecture, built for a local fuel company in 1914.  The three-building facility presently houses the town's public works department.  It was listed on the National Register of Historic Places in 1985.

Description and history
The largest surviving building, a power station occupying a significant portion of the back section of the property, is a prominent local example of Romanesque Revival architecture, with corbelled brick decoration on its cornices. Fronting on Grove Street are two smaller brick buildings, one originally serving as the gas company offices, and the other as a meter house.

The site's previous industrial use was for the Welch and Griffith saw factory, the first in the United States.  This complex burned down in 1913.  The complex was built in 1914 to house the Arlington Gas Company, which manufactured fuel for home use.  It originally included a large storage tank, on top of which was emblazoned "ARLINGTON" and an arrow pointing north; this was one of the earliest known aids to aerial navigation,  and was torn down in 1975.  The complex now serves as the town's public works yard.

See also
National Register of Historic Places listings in Arlington, Massachusetts

References

Industrial buildings and structures on the National Register of Historic Places in Massachusetts
Industrial buildings completed in 1914
National Register of Historic Places in Arlington, Massachusetts
Buildings and structures in Arlington, Massachusetts